Stanwellia hoggi is a ground spider, found in New South Wales, Australia.

References

Pycnothelidae
Spiders of Australia
Spiders described in 1914
Taxa named by William Joseph Rainbow